The siege of Fort Meigs took place in late April to early May 1813 during the War of 1812 in northwestern Ohio, present-day Perrysburg. A small British Army unit with support from Indians attempted to capture the recently constructed fort to forestall an American offensive against Detroit, and its Fort Detroit in the Great Lakes region which the British from the north in Canada had captured the previous year. An American sortie and relief attempt failed with heavy casualties, but the British failed to capture the fort and were forced to raise the siege.

Background 

In the early days of the War of 1812 (1812–1815), an American Army under Brigadier General William Hull (1753–1825), surrendered following the siege of Detroit. To recover the town of Detroit and Fort Detroit, the Americans formed the Army of the Northwest. Brigadier General James Winchester (1752–1826), briefly commanded this army before William Henry Harrison (1773–1841), Congressional delegate and then secretary of the old Northwest Territory, then first governor of the Indiana Territory and future 9th president (1841) was commissioned a major general in the regular United States Army and appointed to the command by fourth president James Madison.

Harrison's advance was hampered by bad weather and shortage of supplies. On 22 January 1813, the leading detachment of his army (commanded by Winchester) was defeated at the Battle of Frenchtown. Harrison withdrew with his main body to the Maumee or also called Miami du Lac River, and in spite of rebukes from future 5th President James Monroe, who was temporarily serving as United States Secretary of War, he declined to resume his advance immediately and instead gave orders for the construction of several forts to protect the rivers and trails which his army would use in any renewed advance. Two of the most important were Fort Meigs (named for Return J. Meigs Jr., the Governor of Ohio) on the Maumee River and Fort Stephenson on the Sandusky River in the northwest corner of the decade old state.

Harrison descended the Maumee to the proposed site of Fort Meigs with an army which ultimately numbered 4,000 men (mainly militia) and began construction of the fort on 1 February 1813. He contemplated making a hit-and-run attack across the frozen Lake Erie against the British position at Amherstburg in Upper Canada and moved to the mouth of the Maumee, but found that the ice on the frozen lake was already breaking up and returned to the half-finished fort. He found the officer he had left in charge, Joel B. Leftwich, had left with all his men because the enlistment period of the militia units assigned to the task had expired. Construction had halted, and the wood that had been cut was being used as firewood.

As the enlistments of Harrison's Ohio and Kentucky militia were also about to expire, Harrison disbanded his force and departed for Cincinnati, Ohio to the south on the Ohio River, to raise a fresh army. He left Army Corps of Engineers Major Eleazer D. Wood to complete the construction of the fort. The garrison consisted of several hundred men from the 17th and 19th Regiments, U.S. Infantry, who were inadequately clothed, plus militia from Pennsylvania and Virginia whose own enlistments were soon to expire.

The fort was on the south bank of the Maumee, near the Miami Rapids. Across the river were the ruins of the old British Fort Miami and the site of the pivotal 1794 Battle of Fallen Timbers. The perimeter consisted of a fifteen-foot picket fence, linking eight blockhouses. The north face was protected by the Maumee, and the east and west faces by ravines. The south face was cleared of all timber to create an open glacis.

The poor weather of early spring prevented a British attack while the fort was still vulnerable. The British Army commander on the Detroit frontier, Major General Henry Procter, had been urged to attack Fort Presque Isle (present day Erie, Pennsylvania), where the Americans were constructing a flotilla intended to seize control of Lake Erie, but Procter refused unless he received substantial reinforcements. Instead, he decided upon an attack on Fort Meigs, to disrupt American preparations for a summer campaign and hopefully capture supplies. Harrison received word of Procter's preparations, and hastened down the Maumee with 300 reinforcements, increasing the garrison of the fort to a total of 1,100 men. He had persuaded Isaac Shelby, the Governor of Kentucky, to call up a brigade of 1,200 Kentucky militia under Brigadier General Green Clay. Clay's brigade followed Harrison down the Maumee, but had not reached the fort before it was besieged.

Siege begins 
Procter's force disembarked at the mouth of the Maumee on 26 April. His force consisted of 31 men of the Royal Artillery, 423 men of the 41st Regiment of Foot, 63 men of the Royal Newfoundland Regiment, 16 men from other units, and 462 Canadian militia. He also had roughly 1,250 Native American warriors led by Shawnee chief Tecumseh and Wyandot chief Roundhead. His artillery consisted of two 24-pounder guns which had been captured at Detroit, nine lighter guns and two gunboats mounting 9-pounder guns.

It took several days for the British force to move up the Maumee and set up batteries. Most of these were on the north side of the river, but one was set up on the south side. Most of the Natives also were on the south side of the river, loosely investing the fort. The British batteries opened fire on 1 May, but most of the cannon shot fired sank harmlessly into the wet earth of the traverses and embankments.

Battle of the Miami 

On 2 May, Harrison sent a courier to Clay's force, with orders for part of them to spike the British guns on the north bank and then withdraw into the fort, while a sortie from the fort attacked the battery on the south bank.

The Kentuckians gained complete surprise. Early on the morning of 5 May, a detachment from Clay's brigade under Colonel William Dudley landed from boats on the north bank of the river. Dudley's command comprised 761 of his own 10th Kentucky Detached Regiment of Militia, 60 of the 13th Kentucky Detached Regiment of Militia and 45 U.S. Army regular troops. This force stormed the batteries on the north bank and spiked the guns but used ramrods for the spiking instead of handspikes, which meant that the cannon were only temporarily disabled. Dudley then lost control of some of his men. Coming under fire from Natives in the woods, part of the Kentuckian force pursued Tecumseh's men, who led them deeper into the forest. Dudley followed in an attempt to bring them back, leaving Major James Shelby in command at the battery. Major Adam Muir led three companies of the 41st Foot and one of Canadian militia from the British camp and stormed the battery, killing many of the Kentuckians and forcing Shelby to surrender. In the woods, the disorganised Kentuckians were decimated in confused fighting against the Natives. Of Dudley's 866 officers and men, only 150 escaped to the fort. This became known as "Dudley's Massacre" or "Dudley's Defeat". The rest of Clay's force, which had not been involved in the attack on the batteries, reached the fort safely to reinforce the garrison.

On the south bank, the American sortie against the British battery was partially successful. Colonel John Miller, at the head of 350 regulars and volunteers, captured the battery and took 41 prisoners. However, Captain Richard Bullock, with the flank companies of the 1/41st Foot, two companies of militia and 300 Indians, counterattacked and, in hard fighting, drove Miller's detachment back into the fort with heavy casualties.

Aftermath 

After the battle, the prisoners from Dudley's command were taken for confinement to the ruined Fort Miami near the British camp. Here, some of the Native warriors began massacring the prisoners and several Americans were killed before Tecumseh, Lieutenant Colonel Matthew Elliott and Captain Thomas McKee of the Indian Department persuaded the warriors to stop. Tecumseh is reputed to have asked Procter why he had not stopped the massacre and, when Procter replied that the Indians could not be made to obey, replied, "Begone! You are unfit to command. Go and put on petticoats". Another version of the incident had Tecumseh rebuking Procter with, "I conquer to save; you to kill". Eye-witness accounts stated that between 12 and 14 prisoners were killed in the massacre.

The battle of 5 May was known to the British as "the Battle of the Miami", having taken place beside the Miami du Lac River (now known as the Maumee River). The 41st Regiment, whose successor in the British Army is the Royal Welsh Regiment, was awarded the battle honour, "Miami", in commemoration of its successful action during the battle.

Within the Canadian Army both the Royal Newfoundland Regiment and the Essex and Kent Scottish Regiment carry the battle honour "Maumee" to commemorate the participation of their ancestor units in the campaign.

Five active regular battalions of the United States Army (1-3 Inf, 2-3 Inf, 4-3 Inf, 2-7 Inf and 3-7 Inf) perpetuate the lineage of the old 17th, 19th and 24th Infantry Regiments, which had elements that were engaged at Fort Meigs.  In addition, Virginia militia units that eventually became the 150th Cavalry (ARNG WV) were present during the construction of the fort.

Casualties 

The British official casualty return gave 14 killed, 47 wounded and 40 captured. It was headed as being for May 5 but it appears to have been for the entire siege up to and including May 5, since it included among the wounded Captain Laurent Bondy of the Canadian militia, who is known to have received his (ultimately fatal) wound from artillery fire on May 3. The Native Americans allied to the British had 19 men killed and wounded, including Roundhead's brother Jean-Baptiste.

Harrison reported the casualties sustained by his garrison in the entire siege, from 28 April to 9 May, as 80 killed and 190 wounded, of whom 12 were killed and 20 wounded by artillery fire. This would indicate 68 killed and 170 wounded during the engagement on 5 May. An official British return of prisoners details 547 captured Americans but a note from Procter states that "since the above return was made out more than eighty prisoners have been brought by the Indians". This would give a total of about 630 Americans captured at the battle. Harrison reported no men missing or captured from his garrison, so all of the prisoners taken on 5 May must have been from Dudley's troops on the north bank of the river. The official casualty report for Dudley's command, compiled after the Kentucky Militia prisoners were paroled, details 80 men killed and 100 wounded (all of whom had been captured). This gives total casualties for Dudley's 866-strong detachment of 80 killed, 100 wounded prisoners, 530 unwounded prisoners and 6 missing; and an overall American loss on May 5 of 148 killed, 170 wounded, 100 wounded prisoners, 530 unwounded prisoners and 6 missing.

End of the siege 
On 7 May, terms were arranged providing for the mutual exchange of all regular prisoners and the parole of the Kentucky Militia prisoners, who were convoyed to Sandusky under pledge of performing no further military service until formally exchanged for British prisoners. On the same day, Procter's artillery resumed fire, but most of the Natives had abandoned the army and the Canadian militia were anxious to get back to their farms. The renewed bombardment had little effect, and the garrison of the fort now outnumbered the besiegers. Procter abandoned the siege on 9 May. The total American loss in the siege came to 160 killed, 190 wounded, 100 wounded prisoners, 530 other prisoners and 6 missing: 986 in all. John Sugden says that 14 killed, 47 wounded and 41 captured were Procter's entire (non-Indian) casualties for the siege, which indicates that 1 man was captured after 5 May.

Order of battle

Second siege 
Once the British had departed, Harrison left Clay in command of the fort with about 100 militiamen. Tecumseh urged Procter to make a renewed effort to capture the fort in July. Tecumseh's warriors staged a mock battle in the woods to make it appear as if they were attacking a column of American reinforcements to lure Clay out of the fort. However, Clay knew no reinforcements were coming, and the ruse failed. Procter quickly abandoned the second siege.

Notes

References 
 Averill, James (1885), Fort Meigs: A Condensed History, Blade Printing and Paper Company

External links 
	
 The War of 1812
 
 Events: Fort Meigs

Conflicts in 1813
Battles of the War of 1812 in Ohio
Battles in the Old Northwest
Sieges involving the United Kingdom
Sieges of the War of 1812
1813 in Ohio
April 1813 events
May 1813 events
Orders of battle